Jeff Varasano is an American speedcuber and pizzeria owner. He is the creator and owner of Varasano's Pizzeria in Atlanta, Georgia and "varasanos.com", a pizza-making blog. Varasano's website has been described as "legendary" by The Atlanta Journal-Constitution. Jeff's 22,000-word recipe has been praised its completeness and accuracy.

On October 8th, 1981, at the age of 15, Jeff set the Rubik's Cube US Record, solving the puzzle in 24.67 seconds. The same year, he had previously published his methods in "Jeff Conquers The Cube in 45 Seconds, And You Can Too!". This record-breaking solve was completed on a live ABC7 News report. He stated at the time to the reporter that it was an "unofficial record". For numerous reasons, this solve is not recognized by the WCA.

References

External links
http://www.varasanos.com

Living people
American businesspeople
American speedcubers
Year of birth missing (living people)